Green box may refer to:

 Green box (container), a large metal container, designed and utilised for free public disposal and recycling of electronic waste.
 Green box (phreaking), a device used to manipulate the coin collection mechanism of payphones
 Green box (WTO agreement), a class of subsidies regulated by the international Agreement on Agriculture
 The Green Box, Marcel Duchamp's published notes on his work The Bride Stripped Bare By Her Bachelors, Even
 A Flash flood watch

See also 
 Green bin, a large, movable, rigid plastic or metal container used to collect biodegradable waste or compostable materials